Wong Chi-keung (born 8 July 1936) is a Taiwanese former footballer. He competed in the men's tournament at the 1960 Summer Olympics.

Honours

Republic of China
Asian Games Gold medal: 1958

References

External links
 

1936 births
Living people
Taiwanese footballers
Chinese Taipei international footballers
Olympic footballers of Taiwan
Footballers at the 1960 Summer Olympics
1960 AFC Asian Cup players
1968 AFC Asian Cup players
Association football forwards
Footballers from Guangzhou
Taiwanese people from Guangdong
Asian Games gold medalists for Chinese Taipei
Asian Games medalists in football
Medalists at the 1958 Asian Games
Footballers at the 1958 Asian Games
Eastern Sports Club footballers